ARLAN is a family of both proprietary non-802.11 and 802.11-compliant wireless networking technologies developed and marketed by Aironet Wireless Communications in the 1990s prior to Aironet's acquisition by Cisco Systems.  Operating in the 900 MHz and 2.4 GHz ISM bands and offering a nominal 2.0 Mbit/s throughput, the non-802.11 DSSS products competed directly with NCR's WaveLAN technology.  After acquisition, the ARLAN lineup was renamed to Cisco Aironet; the non-802.11 products were supported briefly then discontinued.

Hardware
The ARLAN lineup consisted of several offerings:

900 MHz DSSS non-802.11
Half-length ISA card, part number 655-900, RP-TNC connector.  Cisco part number 200-001292.
MCA card, part number 670-900, RP-TNC connector
PC card, part number 690-900, large external antenna dongle
900 MHz access point, part number 630-900
900 MHz bridge, part number 640-900

2.4 GHz DSSS non-802.11
Half-length ISA card, part number 655-2400 (later renamed to IC 2200), RP-TNC connector
MCA card, part number 670-2400, RP-TNC connector
PC card, part number 690-2400 (later renamed to PC 2200), large external antenna dongle
2.4 GHz access point, part number 630-2400
2.4 GHz bridge, part number 640-2400
2.4 GHz high-speed bridge, part number BR2040-EE

2.4 GHz FHSS early 802.11 draft D5 compliant
2.4 GHz PC card, part number PC3000
2.4 GHz PC card, part number LM3000
2.4 GHz access point, part number AP3000

Official specifications

External links
Cisco End-Of-Life announcement about pre-acquisition Aironet devices
Wayback machine archive of documentation on an ARLAN backbone built in Latvia
Linux drivers for Aironet ARLAN
Wayback machine archive of the Aironet products webpage

Wireless networking hardware